Ian Fraser may refer to:
 Ian Fraser, Baron Fraser of Lonsdale (1897–1974), British politician and businessman
 Sir Ian Fraser (surgeon) (1901–1999) Irish surgeon, President of the Royal College of Surgeons in Ireland, President of the British Medical Association
 Ian Fraser (cricketer) (1902–1990), New Zealand cricketer
 Ian Fraser, Baron Fraser of Tullybelton (1911–1989), British judge
 Ian Fraser (Plymouth Sutton MP) (1916–1987), British politician, MP for Plymouth Sutton
 Ian Edward Fraser (1920–2008), British Royal Navy officer and Victoria Cross recipient
 Ian Fraser (Royal Navy pilot) (1921–2015), Royal Navy officer and diplomat
 Ian Fraser (composer) (1933–2014), British composer, nominee for the Academy Award for Original Music Score
 Ian Fraser (broadcaster) (born 1948), New Zealand television interviewer and executive
 Ian Fraser (naturalist) (born 1951), Australian naturalist
 Ian Fraser (New Zealand politician), New Zealand politician, founder of Libertarianz political party
 Ian Fraser (playwright) (born 1962), South African activist and playwright
 Ian Fraser (colonel) (born 1932), producer of large scale military tattoos and events in Canada and overseas

See also
 Iain Fraser (disambiguation)
 Ian Frazer (disambiguation)
 Ian Frazier (disambiguation)